The RVCE Solar Car Team, Bangalore, India is an entirely student-run group that designs and builds solar electric vehicles. The team currently consists of 40 students from R.V. College of Engineering (RVCE) pursuing their Bachelor of Engineering in various fields: Aerospace Engineering, Mechanical Engineering, Electronics and Communication, Electrical Engineering, Computer Science, Chemical Engineering and Industrial Engineering and Management. The team was established in 2013, with an objective to primarily help promote the use of solar technology, as well as inspire younger generations to think green. The team represented India in the World Solar Challenge, 2015 and 2017.

History 
The RVCE Solar Car team was founded in September 2013, by Vikram R. Nath, a Class of 2016 Mechanical Engineer, along with four of his friends from different departments of RVCE. Guided by Prof. M.S. Krupashankar and Lt. Mahendra Kumar, the 18 member team designed and built their first solar car "Soleblaze" from scratch. The team is now one of the largest and most successful student teams in RVCE. The team made successful collaborations with about 30 leading companies from the industry, including Infosys, TCS, SunEdison, Wipro, SunPower, HHV Solar, Reinforced Plastic Industries, National Instruments, Altair, Weather Analytics, TE Connectivity, SanE, 3M, Mahindra Reva, Tritium, Keysight Technologies, Vicor, Molex, Ikoras Solar, Lapp India, Schneider Electric and many more.
The team also received personal guidance from industry veterans, including Chetan Maini, founder of Mahindra REVA and Narayana Murthy, co-founder of Infosys.

The second generation team made further progress with sponsorship from IBM, Wipro, SunPower, HHV Solar, Rhinokore, SanE, Siemens Gamesa, ICP, Anabond, 3M, Honeywell, Bosch, Microsoft Research and many others.

Projects

Soleblaze-1 

Soleblaze-1 is the first prototype of the RVCE Solar Car Team built by the founding team. The project was launched in October 2014 The car represented the country in the World Solar Challenge, 2015. It was one of the few teams that cleared static scrutineering in its initial attempt. However, the car failed to start in the race itself.
 

Specifications:

Due to logistics related issues, the team could not race in the event.

Arka- 1 

Arka- 1 is the latest car of the RVCE Solar Car Team. The prototype was entirely designed and fabricated by the second generation of the team. It is a much improved version of the first car and was launched in August 2017. The car was India's lone entry to the World Solar Challenge, 2017.
The team working on the project consists of 25 students from various departments of RVCE.

Specifications:

See also 
 Solar car
 Solar car racing
 Battery electric vehicle
 List of solar car teams
 World Solar Challenge

References 

Solar-powered vehicles